Patrick Kinane (3 July 1892 – 15 July 1957) was an Irish Clann na Poblachta politician.

Originally a farmer, he was first elected to Dáil Éireann at a by-election on 29 October 1947 in the Tipperary constituency, following the death of the sitting Clann na Talmhan Teachta Dála (TD), William O'Donnell. Clann na Poblachta party leader Seán MacBride was elected on the same day in a by-election in the Dublin County constituency.

Kinane was re-elected at the 1948 general election for the Tipperary North constituency, but lost his seat at the 1951 general election. He was an unsuccessful candidate at the 1954 general election.

References

Clann na Poblachta TDs
1892 births
1957 deaths
Members of the 12th Dáil
Members of the 13th Dáil
Irish farmers